Ten Broeck, also spelled Tenbroeck, is an unincorporated community in DeKalb County, in the U.S. state of Alabama.

History
A post office called Ten Broeck was established in 1880, and remained in operation until 1905. The community was named after a local horse. The horse was likely named after member of the Continental Congress Abraham Ten Broeck.

Demographics

According to the 1930 U.S. Census, Ten Broeck incorporated in 1925. It was the only time it was listed on the census rolls to date.

References

Unincorporated communities in DeKalb County, Alabama
Unincorporated communities in Alabama